Michael Sergio is an actor who parachuted into Shea Stadium during Game 6 of the 1986 World Series, wearing a sign proclaiming "Go Mets". Immediately arrested, Sergio spent a short time in jail because he would not reveal the name of the pilot who flew him over Queens that evening. Senator Al D'Amato later intervened on his behalf, and Sergio was released.

Career
Sergio portrayed Rick in the cult classic slasher film The House on Sorority Row (1983). He won a Daytime Emmy for directing the Ringling Bros. 1996 TV Circus Special and was nominated for an Emmy for Creating the Wizard of Oz on Ice. Sergio also wrote and directed the independent feature Under Hellgate Bridge (2000), featuring The Sopranos regulars Dominic Chianese, Vincent Pastore, and Frank Vincent.

See also
James Miller (parachutist)

References

External links 
 
 Michael Sergio's distribution company, CAVU Pictures

Living people
Year of birth missing (living people)
Baseball spectators
New York Mets postseason
Boston Red Sox postseason
1986 Major League Baseball season